The 2021–22 Danish Cup, also known as Sydbank Pokalen, is the 68th season of the Danish Cup competition. The winner is qualified for the Europa League play-off round.

Structure
92 teams participate in the first round, coming from all levels of competition. Six additional teams will join in the second round, while the top six teams from the 2020–21 Danish Superliga enter in the third round.

Participants
104 teams competed for the Danish Cup. All teams from the top three divisions in 2020–21 were automatically entered, while 54 teams from lower division teams qualified through qualifying matches to enter the competition proper.

First round
There are 92 teams:
 54 teams from the qualifying rounds
28 teams from 2020-21 Danish 2nd Division
 10 teams from 2020–21 Danish 1st Division
In the first round of the tournament, 92 teams took part, including 54 clubs from the various levels of the Denmark Series and below, all clubs from the Danish 3rd Division and Danish 2nd Division the 3rd-12th placed teams from the 2020-21 Danish 1st Division and the 11th-12th placed teams from the 2020-21 Danish Superliga. Strandby-Elling-Nielstrup IF was the lowest ranked team, playing in the 10th tier.

The draw was held on Friday, 2 July 2021.

Second round
There were 52 teams:

 46 teams from the 1st round (winners)
 4 teams from the 2020–21 Danish Superliga (7th–10th placed)
 The 2020–21 Danish 1st Division champions and runners-up
Aalborg Freja, Bredballe IF, and Helsted Fremad IF were the lowest ranked teams left in the tournament.

Third round
There are 32 teams:

 26 teams from the 2nd round (winners)
 6 teams from the 2020–21 Danish Superliga (1st–6th placed)

Fourth round

Quarter-finals

Semi-finals

Final

References

External links
Danish Cup 2021/2022 summary(SOCCERWAY)
Danish Cup 2021/2022 summary (in Danish) (DBU)

2020–21
2021–22 European domestic association football cups
Cup